Hero of Alexandria (Hērōn hò Alexandreús, also known as Heron of Alexandria ;  60 AD) was a Greek mathematician and engineer who was active in his native city of Alexandria in Egypt during the Roman era. He is often considered the greatest experimenter of antiquity and his work is representative of the Hellenistic scientific tradition.

Hero published a well-recognized description of a steam-powered device called an aeolipile (sometimes called a "Hero engine"). Among his most famous inventions was a windwheel, constituting the earliest instance of wind harnessing on land. He is said to have been a follower of the atomists. In his work Mechanics, he described pantographs. Some of his ideas were derived from the works of Ctesibius.

In mathematics he is mostly remembered for Heron's formula, a way to calculate the area of a triangle using only the lengths of its sides.

Much of Hero's original writings and designs have been lost, but some of his works were preserved including in manuscripts from the Eastern Roman Empire and to a lesser extent, in Latin or Arabic translations.

Life and career 
Hero's ethnicity may have been either Greek or Hellenized Egyptian. It is almost certain that Hero taught at the Musaeum which included the famous Library of Alexandria, because most of his writings appear as lecture notes for courses in mathematics, mechanics, physics and pneumatics. Although the field was not formalized until the twentieth century, it is thought that the work of Hero, in particular his automated devices, represented some of the first formal research into cybernetics.

Inventions

Hero described the construction of the aeolipile (a version of which is known as Hero's engine) which was a rocket-like reaction engine and the first-recorded steam engine (although Vitruvius mentioned the aeolipile in De Architectura some 100 years earlier than Hero). It was described almost two millennia before the industrial revolution. Another engine used air from a closed chamber heated by an altar fire to displace water from a sealed vessel; the water was collected and its weight, pulling on a rope, opened temple doors. Some historians have conflated the two inventions to assert that the aeolipile was capable of useful work, which is not entirely false, air containing a trace of water vapor. However, this engine is far from a pure aeolipile.

 The first vending machine was also one of his constructions; when a coin was introduced via a slot on the top of the machine, a set amount of holy water was dispensed. This was included in his list of inventions in his book Mechanics and Optics. When the coin was deposited, it fell upon a pan attached to a lever. The lever opened up a valve which let some water flow out. The pan continued to tilt with the weight of the coin until it fell off, at which point a counter-weight would snap the lever back up and turn off the valve.
 A wind-wheel operating an organ, marking the first instance in history of wind powering a machine.
 Hero also invented many mechanisms for the Greek theatre, including an entirely mechanical play almost ten minutes in length, powered by a binary-like system of ropes, knots, and simple machines operated by a rotating cylindrical cogwheel. The sound of thunder was produced by the mechanically-timed dropping of metal balls onto a hidden drum.
 The force pump was widely used in the Roman world, and one application was in a fire-engine.
 A syringe-like device was described by Hero to control the delivery of air or liquids.
 In optics, Hero formulated the principle of the shortest path of light: If a ray of light propagates from point A to point B within the same medium, the path-length followed is the shortest possible. It was nearly 1,000 years later that Alhacen expanded the principle to both reflection and refraction, and the principle was later stated in this form by Pierre de Fermat in 1662; the most modern form is that the optical path is stationary.
 A stand-alone fountain that operates under self-contained hydro-static energy; now called Heron's fountain.
 A cart that was powered by a falling weight and strings wrapped around the drive axle.
 Various authors have credited the invention of the thermometer to Hero. The thermometer was not a single invention, however, but a development. Hero knew of the principle that certain substances, notably air, expand and contract and described a demonstration in which a closed tube partially filled with air had its end in a container of water. The expansion and contraction of the air caused the position of the water/air interface to move along the tube.
 A self-filling wine bowl, using a float valve.

Mathematics
Hero described a method (now known as Heron's method), for iteratively computing the square root of a number. Today, however, his name is most closely associated with Heron's formula for finding the area of a triangle from its side lengths. He also devised a method for calculating cube roots. He also designed a shortest path algorithm, that is, given two points A and B on one side of a line, find C a point on the straight line that minimizes AC+BC.

In solid geometry, the Heronian mean may be used in finding the volume of a frustum of a pyramid or cone.

Cultural references 
In Arthur C. Clarke's 1953 novel Childhood's End, a model of the turbine is present in the Earth exhibit of the Overlords' museum of alien cultures.
A 1979 Soviet animated short film focuses on Hero's invention of the aeolipile, showing him as a plain craftsman who invented the turbine accidentally

Bibliography

The most comprehensive edition of Hero's works was published in five volumes in Leipzig by the publishing house Teubner in 1903.

Works known to have been written by Hero include:
Pneumatica (Πνευματικά), a description of machines working on air, steam or water pressure, including the hydraulis or water organ
Automata, a description of machines which enable wonders in banquets and possibly also theatrical contexts by mechanical or pneumatical means (e.g. automatic opening or closing of temple doors, statues that pour wine and milk, etc.)
Mechanica, preserved only in Arabic, written for architects, containing means to lift heavy objects
Metrica, a description of how to calculate surfaces and volumes of diverse objects
On the Dioptra, a collection of methods to measure lengths, a work in which the odometer and the dioptra, an apparatus which resembles the theodolite, are described
Belopoeica, a description of war machines
Catoptrica, about the progression of light, reflection and the use of mirrors

Works that sometimes have been attributed to Hero, but are now thought most likely to have been written by someone else:
Geometrica, a collection of equations based on the first chapter of Metrica
Stereometrica, examples of three-dimensional calculations based on the second chapter of Metrica
Mensurae, tools which can be used to conduct measurements based on Stereometrica and Metrica
Cheiroballistra, about catapults
Definitiones, containing definitions of terms for geometry

Works that are preserved only in fragments:
Geodesia
Geoponica

Publications

See also 

 Heronian triangle
 Heronian mean

References

Further reading

External links 

 Webpage about Hero by The Technology Museum of Thessaloniki
 Heron biography at the MacTutor History of Mathematics archive
 
 Heron of Alexandria in online Encyclopædia Britannica
 Online Galleries, History of Science Collections, University of Oklahoma Libraries High resolution images preserved at The Internet Archive
 
 Reconstruction of Heron’s Formulas for Calculating the Volume of Vessels
 Spiritali di Herone Alessandrino From the John Davis Batchelder Collection at the Library of Congress
 Automata Critical edition, with translation and partial commentary by Francesco Grillo (PhD thesis, Univ. of Glasgow, 2019) 
 The Pneumatics of Hero of Alexandria, from the Original Greek. Tr. and ed. by Bennet Woodcroft From the Collections at the Library of Congress

AD 10 births
70 deaths
1st-century Egyptian people
1st-century Greek people
1st-century writers
Ancient Egyptian engineers
Ancient Greek engineers
Ancient Greek inventors
Ancient Greek geometers
Ancient Greek science writers
Egyptian inventors
Egyptian people of Greek descent
Hellenistic engineers
Roman-era Alexandrians
1st-century mathematicians